Uchenna Grace Kanu (born 20 June 1997) is a Nigerian professional footballer who plays as a forward for NWSL club Racing Louisville. Internationally, Kanu represents the Nigeria women's national team.

International career
Kanu represented Nigeria at the 2014 FIFA U-17 Women's World Cup and the 2014 FIFA U-20 Women's World Cup. She made her senior debut on 8 April 2019 in a 1–2 friendly loss to Canada.

International goals

References

External links
 
 
 
 

1997 births
Living people
Sportspeople from Abia State
Nigerian women's footballers
Nigeria women's international footballers
Women's association football forwards
Women's Premier Soccer League players
Nigerian expatriate women's footballers
Nigerian expatriate sportspeople in the United States
Expatriate women's soccer players in the United States
Nigerian expatriate sportspeople in Spain
Expatriate women's footballers in Spain
2019 FIFA Women's World Cup players
Southeastern Fire women's soccer players
Damallsvenskan players
Sevilla FC (women) players
Linköpings FC players
Primera División (women) players
Expatriate women's footballers in Sweden
Nigerian expatriate sportspeople in Sweden